Boutros Boutros-Ghali (14 November 1922 – 16 February 2016) was an Egyptian politician and diplomat who served as the sixth Secretary-General of the United Nations from 1992 to 1996. An academic who previously served as acting foreign minister and vice foreign minister of Egypt, Boutros-Ghali oversaw the UN over a period coinciding with several world crises, including the Breakup of Yugoslavia and the Rwandan genocide. He went on to serve as the first Secretary-General of La Francophonie from 1997 to 2002.

Early life and education 
Boutros Boutros-Ghali was born in Cairo, Egypt, on 14 November 1922 into a Coptic Orthodox Christian family. His father Yusuf Butros Ghali was the son of Boutros Ghali Bey then Pasha (also his namesake), who was Prime Minister of Egypt from 1908 until he was assassinated in 1910. His mother, Safela Mikhail Sharubim, was daughter of Mikhail Sharubim (1861–1920), a prominent public servant and historian. The young boy was brought up by a Slovenian nanny, one of the so-called ; he was closer to Milena, "his invaluable friend and confidant", than to his own mother.

Boutros-Ghali graduated from Cairo University in 1946. He received a PhD in international law from the Faculty of Law of Paris (University of Paris) and diploma in international relations from Sciences Po in 1949. During 1949–1979, he was appointed Professor of International Law and International Relations at Cairo University. He became President of the Centre of Political and Strategic Studies in 1975 and President of the African Society of Political Studies in 1980. He was a Fulbright Research Scholar at Columbia University from 1954 to 1955, Director of the Centre of Research at The Hague Academy of International Law from 1963 to 1964, and Visiting Professor at the Faculty of Law of Paris from 1967 to 1968. In 1986 he received an honorary doctorate from the Faculty of Law at Uppsala University, Sweden. He was also the Honorary Rector of the Graduate Institute of Peace Studies, a branch of Kyunghee University Seoul.

Political career 

Boutros-Ghali's political career developed during the presidency of Anwar Sadat. He was a member of the Central Committee of the Arab Socialist Union from 1974 to 1977. He served as Egypt's Minister of State for Foreign Affairs from 1977 until early 1991. He then became Deputy Minister for Foreign Affairs for several months before moving to the UN. As Minister of State, he played a part in the peace agreements between President Sadat and Israeli prime minister Menachem Begin.

According to investigative journalist Linda Melvern, Boutros-Ghali approved a secret $26 million arms sale to the government of Rwanda in 1990 when he was foreign minister, the weapons stockpiled by the Hutu regime as part of the fairly public, long-term preparations for the subsequent genocide. He was serving as UN secretary-general when the killings occurred four years later.

United Nations Secretary-General

1991 selection 

Boutros-Ghali ran for Secretary-General of the United Nations in the 1991 selection. The top post in the UN was opening up as Javier Pérez de Cuéllar of Peru reached the end of his second term, and Africa was next in the rotation. Boutros-Ghali tied Bernard Chidzero of Zimbabwe in the first two rounds of polling, edged ahead by one vote in round 3, and fell behind by one vote in round 4. After several countries withdrew their support for Chidzero, fed by fears that the United States was trying to eliminate both of the leading candidates, Boutros-Ghali won a clear victory in round 5.

Tenure (1992–1996) 

Boutros-Ghali's term in office remains controversial. In 1992, he submitted An Agenda for Peace, a suggestion for how the UN could respond to violent conflict. He set three goals: for the UN to be more active in promoting democracy, for the UN to conduct preventative diplomacy to avert crises, and to expand the UN's role as peacekeeper. Although the goals were consistent with those of US president George H. W. Bush, he nevertheless repeatedly clashed with the United States, especially with his efforts to involve the UN more deeply in the civil wars in Somalia (1992) and in Rwanda (1994). The United States refused to send peace enforcement units under UN leadership.

Boutros-Ghali was criticised for the UN's failure to act during the 1994 Rwandan genocide, during which over a half million people were killed. Boutros-Ghali also appeared unable to muster support in the UN for intervention in the continuing Angolan Civil War. One of the hardest tasks during his term was dealing with the crisis of the Yugoslav Wars after the disintegration of the former Yugoslavia. The UN peacekeeping force was ineffective in Bosnia and Herzegovina, forcing the intervention by NATO in December 1995. His reputation became entangled in the larger controversies over the effectiveness of the UN and the role of the United States in the UN.

Some Somalis believed he was responsible for an escalation of the Somalia crisis by undertaking a personal vendetta against Mohamed Farrah Aidid and his Habar Gidir clan, favouring their rivals, the Darod, the clan of the former dictator Siad Barre. It was believed that he demanded the 12 July 1993 US helicopter attack on a meeting of Habar Gidir clan leaders, who were meeting to discuss a peace initiative put forward by the leader of the UN Mission in Mogadishu, retired US Admiral Jonathan Howe. It is generally believed that most of the clan elders were eager to arrange peace and rein in the subversive activities of their clan leader Aidid. Still, after this attack on a peaceful meeting, the clan was resolved to fight the Americans and the UN, leading to the Battle of Mogadishu on 3–4 October 1993.

Second term vetoed 

Boutros-Ghali ran unopposed for the customary second term in 1996, despite efforts by the United States to unseat him. US ambassador Madeleine Albright asked Boutros-Ghali to resign and offered to establish a foundation for him to run, an offer that other Western diplomats called "ludicrous". American diplomatic pressure also had no effect, as other members of the Security Council remained unwavering in their support for Boutros-Ghali. He won 14 of the 15 votes in the Security Council, but the sole opposing vote was a US veto. After four deadlocked meetings of the Security Council, France offered a compromise in which Boutros-Ghali would be appointed to a short term of two years, but the United States rejected the French offer. Finally, Boutros-Ghali suspended his candidacy, becoming the second Secretary-General ever to be denied re-election by a veto, with Kurt Waldheim being the first.

Later life 

From 1997 to 2002, Boutros-Ghali was Secretary-General of La Francophonie, an organisation of French-speaking nations. From 2002 to 2005, he served as the chairman of the board of the South Centre, an intergovernmental research organisation of developing countries. Boutros-Ghali played a "significant role" in creating Egypt's National Council for Human Rights and served as its president until 2012.

Boutros-Ghali supported the Campaign for the Establishment of a United Nations Parliamentary Assembly and was one of the initial signatories of the Campaign's appeal in 2007. In a message to the Campaign, he stressed the necessity to establish democratic participation of citizens at the global level. From 2009 to 2015 he also participated as a jury member for the Conflict Prevention Prize, awarded every year by the Fondation Chirac.

Personal life 
Boutros-Ghali's wife, Leia Maria Nadler, was raised in an Egyptian Jewish family in Alexandria and converted to Catholicism as a young woman.

Boutros-Ghali died aged 93 in a Cairo hospital after being admitted for a broken pelvis or leg on 16 February 2016. A military funeral was held for him with prayers led by Pope Tawadros II of Alexandria. He is buried at Petrine Church in Abbassia, Cairo.

Honorary degrees 

Awards and recognition 
 The World Affairs Council Christian A. Herter memorial award, Boston (March 1993)
 The Arthur A. Houghton Jr. Star Crystal Award for Excellence de l'Institut afro- américain, New York (November 1993)
 Member of the Académie des Sciences Morales et Politiques
 Honorary membership of the Order of Canada
 Honorary membership of the Russian Academy of Natural Sciences, Moscow (April 1994)
 Honorary foreign membership of the Russian Academy of Sciences, Moscow (April 1994)
 Honorary foreign membership of the Academy of Sciences of Belarus, Minsk (April 1994)
 Fellow of Berkeley College, Yale University (March 1995)
 The recipient of the Onassis Award for International Understanding and Social Achievement (July 1995)

Honours

National honours

Foreign honours

Published works 
As Secretary-General, Boutros-Ghali wrote An Agenda for Peace. He also published other memoirs:

In English 

 The Arab League, 1945–1955: Ten Years of Struggle, ed.  Carnegie Endowment for International Peace, New York, 1954
 New Dimensions of Arms Regulations and Disarmament in the Post Cold War, ed. United Nations, New York, 1992
 An Agenda for Development, ed. United Nations, New York, 1995
 Confronting New Challenges, ed. United Nations, New York, 1995
 Fifty Years of the United Nations, ed. William Morrow, New York, 1995
 The 50th Anniversary: Annual Report on the Work of the Organization, ed. United Nations, New York, 1996
 An Agenda for Democratization, ed. United Nations, New York, 1997
 Egypt's Road to Jerusalem: A Diplomat's Story of the Struggle for Peace in the Middle East, ed. Random House, New York, 1998
 Essays on Leadership (with George H. W. Bush, Jimmy Carter, Mikhail Gorbachev, and Desmond Tutu), ed. Carnegie Commission on Preventing Deadly Conflict, Washington, 1998
 Unvanquished: A US-UN Saga, ed. I. B. Tauris, New York, 1999
 The Papers of United Nations Secretary (with Charles Hill), ed. Yale University Press, New York, 2003
 The Arab League, 1945–1955: International Conciliation, ed. Literary Licensing Publisher, London, 2013

In French 

 Contribution à l'étude des ententes régionales, ed. Pedone, Paris, 1949
 Cours de Diplomatie et de Droit Diplomatique et consulaire, ed. Librairie Anglo-égyptienne, Cairo, 1951
 Le problème du canal de Suez, ed. Société égyptienne du droit international, Cairo, 1957
 Le principe d'égalité des États et des organisations internationales, ed. Académie de droit international, Leiden, 1961
 Contribution à une théorie générale des alliances, ed. Pedone, Paris, 1963
 Le Mouvement afro-asiatique, ed. Presses universitaires de France, Paris, 1969
 L'organisation de l'Unité africaine, ed. Armand Colin, Paris, 1969
 Les difficultés institutionnelles du panafricanisme, ed. Institut Universitaire des Hautes études Internationales, Geneva, 1971
 Les conflits des frontières en Afrique, ed. Techniques et Économiques, Paris, 1972
 Contribution à une théorie générale des alliances, ed. Pedone, Paris, 1991
 L'interaction démocratie et développement [eds.], ed. Unesco, Paris, 2002
 Démocratiser la mondialisation, ed. Rocher, Paris, 2002
 Émanciper la Francophonie, ed. L'Harmattan, Paris, 2003
 60 Ans de conflit israélo-arabe : Témoignages pour l'Histoire (with Shimon Peres), ed. Complexes, Paris, 2006

See also 
 List of Copts

References

Citations

Bibliography

Further reading

External links 

 
 Boutros Boutros-Ghali papers at the United Nations Archives

|-

|-

|-

1922 births
2016 deaths
20th-century Egyptian diplomats
21st-century Egyptian diplomats
Cairo University alumni
Coptic politicians
Academic staff of Cairo University
Members of the Institut de Droit International
Foreign Members of the Russian Academy of Sciences
Foreign ministers of Egypt
The Hague Academy of International Law people
Honorary Companions of the Order of Canada
International Law Commission officials
Members of the Académie des sciences morales et politiques
Officers of the Order of Merit of the Grand Duchy of Luxembourg
People of the Rwandan genocide
Grand Crosses of the Order of the Star of Romania
Columbia University faculty
Sciences Po alumni
Secretaries-General of the Organisation internationale de la Francophonie
Secretaries-General of the United Nations
Accidental deaths from falls
Egyptian officials of the United Nations
Boutros Ghali family
Fulbright alumni